Bogdan Raczynski (born 1977) is a Polish-American electronic musician. Associated with the intelligent dance music (IDM) movement, Raczynski's work draws inspiration from the chaotic breakbeats of jungle and hardcore rave as well as traditional Polish music and other sources. 

Raczynski's early recordings were created using music tracker programs such as Impulse Tracker, and he participated with tracker-focused netlabels such as the Kosmic Free Music Foundation. Raczynski's post-netlabel albums were released on Rephlex Records until its closure in 2014. Rephlex founder Richard D. James cited Raczynski as an inspiration for tracks on his album drukQs. His work includes remixes of Björk and Ulver.

Biography
Raczynski was born in Poland and emigrated to rural Nebraska with his family at the age of 7. He attended art school in Japan, but dropped out and eventually became homeless, living on the streets of Tokyo or in friends' homes. He sent a demo of Boku Mo Wakaran to Rephlex Records before returning to his parents' home in the US. After signing with Rephlex, he bounced between England, Ireland, the United States, and Canada as performances and visa problems required.

Discography

Albums
 Boku Mo Wakaran (1999)
 Samurai Math Beats (1999)
 Thinking of You (1999)
 MyLoveILove (2001)
 96 Drum 'n' Bass Classixxx (2002)
 Renegade Platinum Mega Dance Attack Party: Don the Plates (2003)
 Alright! (2007)
 Rave 'Till You Cry (2019)
 ADDLE (2022)

EPs
 Ibiza Anthems Vol. 4 (1999)
 Muzyka Dla Imigrantów (2001)
 I Will Eat Your Children Too! (2003)
 Debt (2020)
 BANANS (2021)

Remixes
 Autechre – "EP7/Envane", on Warp 10+3 (1999)
 Ulver – "Bog's Basil & Curry Powder Potatoes Recipe", on 1993–2003: 1st Decade in the Machines (2003)
 Björk – "Who Is It (Shooting Stars & Asteroids Mix)" (2005)

Video game music
 Nucleus – Soundtrack (2007)

References

Further reading

External links

 Official website
 Official Bandcamp
 
 

1977 births
American electronic musicians
American people of Polish descent
Intelligent dance musicians
Tracker musicians
Polish musicians
Polish electronic musicians
Canadian people of Polish descent
Living people
Braindance musicians
Planet Mu artists